Trust/Confío is a studio album by Jaci Velasquez, released on March 31, 2017 as a two-disc collection where one disc contains her eighth English-language album, Trust, while the other disc contains her fourth Spanish-language album, Confío. At the 48th GMA Dove Awards, Confío won Spanish Language Album of the Year. The album reached No. 7 on the Billboard Latin Pop chart and was nominated for the 2017 Latin Grammys for Christian Album of the Year.

Awards and accolades 

On August 9, 2017, the Gospel Music Association announced that Confio was nominated for a GMA Dove Award in the Spanish Album of the Year category at the 48th Annual GMA Dove Awards. On October 17, 2017, Confio won the GMA Dove Award for Spanish Album of the Year with producers David Leonard and Chris Bevins being the receipts at a ceremony at Allen Arena in Nashville, Tennessee.

Track listing

Charts

References 

2017 albums
Jaci Velasquez albums